The Arsenal de Marinha do Rio de Janeiro (AMRJ) is a military organization of the Brazilian Navy. It is located in Ilha das Cobras, at the Guanabara Bay, in the city of Rio de Janeiro. The Arsenal is the main maintenance center and naval base of the Brazilian Navy, involving the design, construction and maintenance of ships and submarines, not only for the Brazilian Navy, but also friendly nations.

The AMRJ provides shipbuilding services both for military strategic reasons (mastery of technologies, seeking the reduction of external dependence), as economic ones, seeking nationalisation of components and the encouragement of domestic industry.

History 
The institution dates back to the installation of the Arsenal of Rio de Janeiro, at the foot of the hill of St. Benedict. Created on 29 December 1763, by the governor-general of Brazil António Álvares da Cunha, the first Count da Cunha, with the purpose of repairing ships of the Portuguese Navy. At the time, the capital of the colony was being transferred from Salvador to Rio de Janeiro, among other reasons, for a better protection of the gold that came from Minas Gerais by the Royal Road.

With the arrival of the Portuguese Royal Family in 1808, the Arsenal started to be designated as Arsenal Real da Marinha or simply as Arsenal da Corte. In 1820, its dependencies began to expand to the Ilha das Cobras. After the independence of Brazil, faced with the need to organize and operate a Navy, the activities of the Arsenal became a priority. At this stage, it started to be called as Arsenal Imperial da Marinha, better known as Arsenal de Marinha da Corte.

The nineteenth century watched the transition from sailing to steam navigation. During the so-called Mauá era, vessels were built in the shipyard in Ponta d'Areia, in Niterói. Later, with the outbreak of the Paraguayan War, vessels for the Imperial Brazilian Navy were built in shipyards in England and in the AMRJ. At the end of the conflict, Brazil had the most powerful navy in the South Atlantic. In 1938 two Arsenals coexisted: the Arsenal de Marinha das Ilha das Cobras (AMIC) and the Arsenal de Marinha do Rio de Janeiro (AMRJ). 

After 1948, only the Arsenal located in Ilha das Cobras survived, assuming the designation of Arsenal de Marinha do Rio de Janeiro.

Main achievements 
Between the construction of surface units and submarines, and the activity of maintenance of the fleet are:
 2005 - 2009 - two dockings and a revitalization program of the aircraft carrier São Paulo;
 2005 - 2006 - transport of the submarine Timbira from sea to workshop, using ferries and trucks ("load-in") and realization of its Programme of General Maintenance within a much lower time than the ones on Tupi and Tamoio's PMGs (General Modernisation Programs);
 2005 - refurbishment of gearboxes of the frigate Constituição;
 2003 - docking of the aircraft carrier São Paulo;
 constructing the submarines Tamoio, Timbira, Tapajó and Tikuna (Tikuna's construction time was reduced in 11 months, recovering part of the delay, due to budget constraints);
 construction of the Niterói Class frigates: Independência and União;
 construction of the Inhaúma Class corvettes: Inhaúma and Jaceguai;
 Modernization Programme (ModFrag) of all Niterói class frigates.
 large repairs in Argentine submarine ARA Santa Cruz, including cutting the hull.

The AMRJ was honored by the Pan American Institute of Naval Engineering for its "contribution to the development of the Naval Engineering in the America", in 2002–2003, during the meeting in Havana, Cuba. The achievement was repeated in 2004–2005, during the meeting in Guayaquil, Ecuador.

Ships built in AMRJ 
 The first ship built on the Arsenal was the D. Sebastião, finished in 1767.
 The oldest in operation: monitor Parnaíba, finished in 1937.

See also 
 List of ships of the Brazilian Navy
 Brazilian Marine Corps
 Brazilian Naval Aviation

Citations

References

External links 
 Official website 
 Base Militar Web Magazine - Databank of Brazilian Navy Warships
 Poder Naval OnLine - Everything about naval forces in the world.
 AMRJ history
 Brazilian Warships - All the warships and classes used by the Brazilian Navy
 Map of the facilities on the OpenStreetMap

Brazilian Navy
Defence companies of Brazil
Military installations of Brazil
Guanabara Bay
Buildings and structures in Rio de Janeiro (city)
Manufacturing companies based in Rio de Janeiro (city)
Shipbuilding companies of Brazil
Arsenals